Poonoor ( പൂനൂർ ) is a town in Kozhikode District, Kerala, India. The town is part of the Unnikulam Panchayath, within the Thamarassery Taluk of the Kozhikode District. Poonoor can be found on the banks of the Poonoor River 4.5 km west of Thamarassery and 8.5 km east of Balussery. The town is situated on Koyilandy-Edavanna Road State Highway 34 (SH 34) now known as (HW34) that starts in Koyilandy and ends in Edavanna.

References

Villages in Kozhikode district
Thamarassery area